The 1884 United States presidential election in New Hampshire took place on November 4, 1884, as part of the 1884 United States presidential election. Voters chose four representatives, or electors to the Electoral College, who voted for president and vice president.

New Hampshire voted for the Republican nominee, James G. Blaine, over the Democratic nominee, Grover Cleveland. Blaine won the state by a narrow margin of 4.80%. This would be the last occasion a Democratic presidential candidate won Belknap County until Woodrow Wilson won it in 1912.

Results

Results by county

See also
 United States presidential elections in New Hampshire

References

New Hampshire
1884
1884 New Hampshire elections